Laxmi Nagar Assembly constituency is one of the seventy Delhi assembly constituencies of Delhi in northern India.
Laxmi Nagar assembly constituency is a part of East Delhi (Lok Sabha constituency). This constituency was created by reorganization by delimitation commission in 2022.

Members of Legislative Assembly

Election results

2020

2015

2013

2008

References

Assembly constituencies of Delhi
East Delhi district